Igor Drljaca (born 1983) is a Bosnian Canadian film writer, producer and director. A graduate of York University, he cofounded the Canadian production company Timelapse Pictures with Albert Shin.

Career 
As a writer and director, he has made the narrative feature films Krivina (2012), The Waiting Room (2015) and The White Fortress (2021), as well as the feature documentary The Stone Speakers (2018). His short films include Woman in Purple (2009); On a Lonely Drive (2009); The Fuse: Or How I Burned Simon Bolivar (2011), which was a Canadian Screen Award nominee for Best Short Documentary at the 1st Canadian Screen Awards; and The Archivists (2020).

As a producer, he received a Canadian Screen Award nomination at the 3rd Canadian Screen Awards for Shin's Best Picture-nominated film In Her Place (2014), and was a producer of Bojan Bodružić's 2018 documentary film The Museum of Forgotten Triumphs.

At the 10th Canadian Screen Awards in 2022, Drljaca received a nomination for Best Original Screenplay for The White Fortress.

Teaching 
Drljaca is an assistant professor in film production at the University of British Columbia's theatre and film department.

References

External links

 website

1983 births
Living people
Bosnia and Herzegovina emigrants to Canada
Film producers from British Columbia
Film people from Sarajevo
Academic staff of the University of British Columbia
York University alumni
Writers from Sarajevo
Canadian male screenwriters
21st-century Canadian screenwriters
21st-century Canadian male writers
Canadian film production company founders